Nameh Shir Rural District is a rural district (dehestan) in Namshir District, Baneh County, Kurdistan Province, Iran. At the 2006 census, its population was 6,643, in 1,157 families. The rural district has 22 villages.

References 

Rural Districts of Kurdistan Province
Baneh County